Giant Electric Pea (often abbreviated as GEP) is an independent music label based in London, England and Berlin, Germany. Their releases consist of progressive rock, neo-progressive rock and progressive metal music albums.

History
Giant Electric Pea was formed in 1992 by Michael Holmes, Thomas Waber (also founder of European independent music labels, Inside Out Music and Superball Music), Laurence Dyer and Martin Orford. The label was originally intended as a vehicle for IQ's 1993 album, 'Ever' but went on to become the first independent music label for progressive rock, quickly establishing itself within the genre by signing new bands such as Spock's Beard, Jadis and Threshold to the label. GEP have also released albums by established artists such as John Wetton and Renaissance.

Management
Giant Electric Pea is now managed by four directors:
 Michael Holmes - CEO, also known for his work with progressive rock band IQ and solo project The Lens.
 Rob Aubrey - Technical Director, sound engineer and owner of recording studio 'Aubitt Studios'.
 Peter Huth - Marketing Director and Berlin-based journalist, author and editor-in-chief of German Sunday newspaper Welt am Sonntag.
 Thomas Waber - Business Director. Waber is also founder of European independent record labels, Inside Out Music and Superball Music who are responsible for many of today's Progressive artists.

Artists
 IQ
 Big Big Train
 Synaesthesia
 The Lens
 Steve Thorne
 Martin Orford
 Renaissance
 Spock's Beard
 Niadem's Ghost
 Threshold
 John Wetton
 Damanek
 Southern Empire

See also
Inside Out Music
IQ (band)

References

British independent record labels
German independent record labels